Rosemary Sandlin (born May 31, 1946 in Springfield, Massachusetts) is an American politician who represented the Third Hampden District in the Massachusetts House of Representatives from 2007–2011 and spent 22 years as a member of the Agawam, Massachusetts School Committee.

References

1946 births
Living people
Politicians from Springfield, Massachusetts
Democratic Party members of the Massachusetts House of Representatives
Women state legislators in Massachusetts
People from Agawam, Massachusetts
21st-century American women